Erebia mackinleyensis, the Mt. McKinley alpine, is a member of the subfamily Satyrinae of family Nymphalidae. It is found from eastern Siberia through Alaska and Yukon, just reaching into the Northwest Territories in the Richardson Mountains and into British Columbia at Stone Mountain Provincial Park.

The wingspan is 41–53 mm. Adults are on wing in late June and July. Its habitats include alpine scree and boulder fields.

Similar species
Magdalena alpine (E. magdalena)

References

Erebia
Butterflies of Asia
Butterflies of North America